Malakal is a city in South Sudan. It is the capital of Upper Nile State, South Sudan, along the White Nile River. It also serves as the headquarter of Malakal county and it used to be the headquarter of Upper Nile Region from 1970s to late 1990s.

Geography 
The city of Malakal is located along the White Nile, in upper Nile state, South Sudan, close to the International borders with the Republic of Sudan and with Ethiopia. The town is located on the banks of the White Nile, just north of its confluence with the Sobat River.

History 
Historically, Malakal was known as the former Sobat District. The Malakal town started as a tiny District administrative unit which later expanded into a big town becoming the capital city of the Upper Nile State (since 2020). It was also the capital of the defunct Eastern Nile State and Central Upper Nile State During the Second Sudanese Civil War, the town was a garrison town of the Khartoum-based Sudanese Armed Forces (SAF). Following South Sudan's independence on 9 July 2011, the troops from the Republic of Sudan have retreated from Malakal. Malakal was the site of the November 2006 Battle of Malakal.

Beginning in 2013, Malakal has been the site of numerous battles between government SPLA forces and the Nuer White Army, loosely commanded by the SPLM-IO which is headed by Riek Machar.  The city has been overrun on various occasions by both sides. As of October 2015, Malakal had exchanged hands twelve times during the civil war, and was utterly destroyed in the process.

Education 
The Upper Nile University was founded in 1991.

Places of worship 
Among the places of worship, they are predominantly Christian churches and temples : Roman Catholic Diocese of Malakal (Catholic Church), Province of the Episcopal Church of South Sudan (Anglican Communion), Baptist Convention of South Sudan (Baptist World Alliance), Presbyterian Church in Sudan (World Communion of Reformed Churches). There are also Muslim mosques.

Climate 
Like other parts of the Sahel, Malakal has a hot semi-arid climate (Köppen climate classification BSh), with a wet season and a dry season and the temperature being hot year-round. The hottest time of year is from February to May, just before the wet season starts.

Malakal receives  of rain over 68.0 precipitation days, with a distinct wet and dry season like all of South Sudan. December and January receive no precipitation at all, and  almost no rain falls from November to March. August, the wettest month, receives  of rainfall on average. August also has 14.9 precipitation days, which is the most of any month. Humidity is much higher in the wet season than the dry season, with February having a humidity at just 25% and August having a humidity at 80%. Malakal receives 2778.7 hours of sunshine annually on average, with the sunshine being distributed fairly evenly across the year, although it is lower during the wet season. December receives the most sunshine, while July receives the least.

Transportation
A major road linking Malakal with the town of Kurmuk at the border with Ethiopia is under repairs and renovations to asphalt surface. The road is expected to be ready for commissioning by May 2013.
The city of Malakal is also served by Malakal International Airport, one of the two International airports in South Sudan, the other being Juba International Airport.
Water traffic on the White Nile River can travel as far north as Khartoum in the Republic of Sudan, and as far south as Adok in Lakes State.

Newspapers
Malakal has very limited newspapers circulated in hardcopy form. However, the Juba-based 'Citizen' is widely read around the town. In the eve of Independence day on July 9, 2011, The Upper Nile Times online newspaper was launched. The website for this online digital newspaper is no longer active.

Population
 the population of Malakal was estimated at 129,620. The 2008 Sudanese census, which was boycotted by the South Sudanese government, recorded a population of about 126,500. However, those results are disputed by the authorities in Juba. In 2010, it was estimated that the population of Malakal had grown to about 139,450. Below is a table depicting the estimated population of the city from 1983 until 2010 from all sources:

Notable people 

 Abuk Payiti Ayik, has represented Malakal in the Southern Sudan Legislative Assembly and the National Legislative Assembly
 Aguil Chut-Deng, revolutionary and activist
 Nahid Gabrallah, human rights activist
 Sayed Abdel Gadir, boxer

Gallery

See also 
 Upper Nile (state)
 Greater Upper Nile
 List of cities in South Sudan

References

External links 

Location of Malakal At Google Maps
Malakal Vocational Training Centre.
The Gateway to the Shilluk People of Malakal.
+.

 
Populated places in Upper Nile (state)
State capitals in South Sudan
Sobat River
Greater Upper Nile